Patricia Rosemary "Pat" Smythe, OBE (22 November 1928 – 27 February 1996) was a British show jumper. She competed at the 1956 and 1960 Summer Olympics, winning a team bronze medal in 1956. She served as president of the British Show Jumping Association in 1983–86, and as vice-president ion 1987–96. She also wrote many books on equestrian themes, largely for children.

Early years
Pat Smythe was the last of three children, the other two being Dicky and Ronald Smythe. Dicky died from pneumonia at the age of four. Her parents were Eric Hamilton Smythe and Frances Monica Curtoys, who were born in the early 1900s. She was born in East Sheen, and at the age of 10 moved to Cotswolds. Later she was a boarder at Talbot Heath School in Bournemouth.

Pat nearly died from diphtheria when she was five. Although she recovered fully, it meant that she had to learn to walk again. Hardship and suffering were to feature predominantly throughout her professional and personal life. Her father died of ill health when she was in her late teens, and her mother was killed in a car crash when she was 23.

War years
World War II brought times of separation for the family. In early 1940 her father was sent to Biskra in Algeria to heal his arthritis. Her mother remained in London working for the Red Cross. During her father's return from North Africa via France, her mother set out to find him. They met in Aix-les-Bains, and escaped from France under enemy fire, on the very last boat leaving Bordeaux just before the Germans occupied the city.

Pat herself was sent to the Cotswolds for her safety, along with her pony, Pixie. Her brother had been evacuated to Newquay in Cornwall, where his school had relocated. It was during that time, whilst getting into an entanglement with several horses, that Pat met the King in the middle of the road. Unaware of who he was, she said to the driver of the car he was travelling in Shut up! Can't you see I'm trying to get these horses out of the road!

In early 1941, Pat and her parents relocated to a house in the Cotswolds. Her parents had to work hard, and their house was turned into a guesthouse. In 1949, after her father's death, Pat and her mother moved again, to Miserden in the Cotswolds.

Ponies and horses
Smythe's first ride was on a small pony known as Bubbles.  Although he was her brother's pony, she learned to ride on him but outgrew him eventually.  After that, her parents bought her a Dartmoor/Arab-cross pony named Pixie.  Pixie was later mated and gave birth to a filly called Vicky.

Pat's mother used to be sent polo ponies by a friend of the family, Johnny Traill, to break and be schooled for polo playing.  Although they were not hers, when she was older, Pat also helped school and break them.

It was not until Pat's relocation to the Cotswolds that her first taste of showjumping came with Finality. After varied success at gymkhanas and numerous injuries which Finality suffered, Pat was able to compete in her first International Show. Eventually she was asked to join the British team with Colonel Harry Llewellyn, Ruby Holland-Martin, Toby Robeson and Brian Butler in 1947.  But the partnership with Finality was not to last. She had been lent to the family by Johnny Traill and, due to financial pressure, had to be sold.

Pat's next horse, the grey mare Carmena, came after the parting with Finality. Although Carmena was a talented and successful horse, Pat admitted that she could never feel the same closeness she had had with Finality.

Shortly after Carmena came another mare, Leona. Leona served Pat well until the death of her mother meant that finances became tight. Being the most valuable horse (at the time), Leona had to be sold.

In 1949, Pat acquired her cheapest horse, Prince Hal.  Bought as an ex-racehorse, he was initially named Fourtowns.

Tosca was Pat's next purchase.  She was born in 1945. It was her most successful partnership after Finality, winning many medals and major showjumping prizes of the day.  Tosca was one of the ones she most often competed abroad.  After Tosca's retirement from showjumping in the mid 1950s, she bred several foals, including Lucia (by Gay Scot, born 1957), Favourita (by Blue Duster, born 1958), Flamenca (by Tambourin, born 1959), Laurella (by Schapiro, born 1960), Prince Igor (by Shapiro born 1961), Chocolate Soldier (her sixth, by either Bitter Sweet or Cortachy, born 1962), Melba (by Pincola, born 1963), Sir John (by Shapiro, born 1964) and a final foal (name unknown, by Three Card Trick).  It may have been the case that after 1965, she produced several more foals.

Lucia herself produced a few foals herself which include Titania (by Schapiro, born 1962), Caruso (by Pinicola, born 1963) and Queen of Hearts (by Three Card Trick, born 1965)

Later showjumping horses included Flanagan (on which she won the Bronze medal in the Team Jumping event at the 1956 Olympic games in Stockholm), Brigadoon, Scorchin, Mr Pollard, Ocean Foam and Telebrae.

She married after the Summer Olympics in 1960 to childhood friend Sam Koechlin and became Patricia Koechlin-Smythe.  This meant a move to Switzerland (as he was Swiss) and it was there that many of her books, including several pony books for children, were written.  Sam died in 1986 and Pat moved back to the Cotswolds.

In 1963 she married Samuel Koechlin, a Swiss lawyer, businessman and Olympic equestrian. She accompanied him on business trips all around the world until his death in 1985. She had two daughters. Smythe died from a heart disease aged 67.

Books
Smythe was a prolific writer, and already by the age of 30 published 11 books.

Biographies
Flanagan My Friend

    English version Jump for Joy; Pat Smythe's Story.  E.P.Dutton, New York. 1955
Jumping Around the World
Leaping Life's Fences

Tosca and Lucia
Florian's Farmyard

Non fictional books

Bred to Jump
Horses And Places

Fictional books

Three Jays Series

Three Jays Against The Clock (Cassel, 1958)
Three Jays on Holiday (Cassel, 1958)
Three Jays Go To Town (Cassel, 1959)
Three Jays Over The Border (Cassel, 1960)
Three Jays Go To Rome (Cassel, 1960)
Three Jays Lend A Hand (Cassel, 1961)

Adventure Series
A Swiss Adventure  (Cassell, 1970) 
A Spanish Adventure  (Cassell, 1971) 
A Cotswold Adventure  (Cassell, 1973)

References

External links

An article about collecting old pony books, featuring her fictional work
An website with cover scans of her books, including information about her literary work and her life
A website with cover scans of her fictional work
An article about her career and background on family
A picture of her receiving her bronze medal in the 1956 Olympics

1928 births
1996 deaths
English female equestrians
Olympic equestrians of Great Britain
British female equestrians
Equestrians at the 1956 Summer Olympics
Equestrians at the 1960 Summer Olympics
Olympic bronze medallists for Great Britain
British show jumping riders
English children's writers
Olympic medalists in equestrian
People educated at Talbot Heath School
Pony books
British women children's writers
20th-century English writers
20th-century English women writers
Medalists at the 1956 Summer Olympics